Gevora Hotel (Arabic: فندق جيفورا) is a  tall hotel along Sheikh Zayed Road in the city Dubai, UAE. That height has given the skyscraper the title of tallest hotel building according to Guinness World Records. The four-star hotel opened in February 2018 after a construction period of twelve years. It has 528 rooms spread over 75 floors and a number of facilities including restaurants and a pool on top of its parking garage building.

Gevora Hotel is close to the Dubai International Financial Centre and its namesake metro station, the Rose Rayhaan by Rotana, and the Emirates Towers.

History 

Construction of the building started in 2005 with Al Attar Properties as developer. During the construction phase, the building was known as Ahmed Abdul Rahim Al Attar Tower (Arabic: برج أحمد عبد الرحيم العطار) after the chairman of the development firm. The architect of record was Al Turath Engineering Consultants. The contractors included Al Fara'a General Contracting, Naresco Contracting, and Caterpillar Contracting. It was engineered by the firms Gulf Engineering & Consultants (structural) and Al Attar Electromechanical Engineering (MEP).

After the groundwork was laid in 2005, the tower rose between the spring of 2006 and the summer of 2008, when the top floors were reached. One new floor was added every five days. When a new floor was constructed, first the staircase and elevator shafts were erected, followed by the outer walls and their surrounding beams. Finally, the spaces in between were filled. After the main structure was finished, the building was fully clad and the crown was installed. The building was initially planned as a residential tower, but was converted into a hotel during construction. It was completed in 2017 after twelve years of construction. Gulf News reported the construction had cost over 500 million AED (US$140 million). After its completion, it was revealed that the building would be a hotel with the name "Gevora Hotel". The first guests arrived on 12 February 2018.

Architecture 

The Gevora Hotel consists of a main hotel building and a parking garage building. Besides being the tallest hotel, Gevora Hotel is also the eighth-tallest completed building in Dubai, the ninth-tallest in the United Arab Emirates, and among the 50 tallest buildings in the world.

To stabilize the narrow structure, a deep foundation was used. The 75 floors the building has include a mezzanine located above the first floor and three mechanical floors (labeled 11, 42, and 73). An additional two floors are located in the basement. The main structure consists of concrete and steel and is covered in a glass façade, that includes gold-tinted elements. The floors can be reached by six elevators, three of which reach the top of the building. A pyramid-shaped crown-like structure with a gold color and lattice pattern sits upon the roof.

A parking garage building with thirteen floors is situated to the east of the main building. Besides serving as a car park, the building also houses some of the hotel's facilities on its roof including a pool. The rooftop of the parking garage structure is connected to the main hotel building through a skyway.

Hotel 

The four-star Gevora Hotel is entered through the lobby on the first floor. The lobby is decorated using marble and gold-colored elements. The Guinness World Records plaque stating that Gevora Hotel is the tallest hotel is displayed in the lobby as well. The 528 rooms are located above the lobby. The 32 suites with two bedrooms occupy  each.

Furthermore, Gevora Hotel has a number of facilities for its guests. The first floor houses a coffee shop called Le Veyron Café next to the lobby. The mezzanine floor above is occupied by the all-day international restaurant Gevora Kitchen. The 12th floor has a skyway that connects the hotel to the parking garage building. The 12th floor also features a meeting room, a gift shop, and a fitness center with separate facilities for men and women, containing a sauna and a steam room. The top floor houses a spa, while the rooftop offers views and features two pools. Gevora Hotel has plans to add two new restaurants including one on its top floor.

Floors

References

External links 

 Official website

Hotel buildings completed in 2017
Hotels established in 2018
Skyscraper hotels in Dubai
2017 establishments in the United Arab Emirates